The Qubain family (also known as: Qubein, Cobain, Cobein, Kubein and Kobein. Arabic: قبعين ) are a wealthy Christian family of Jordanian descent. The family owns businesses and establishments throughout the region and is involved in the furniture, financial, medical and engineering service industries.

Etymology 
The name Qubain originates from the Arabic word quba-atain, ( Arabic: قُبعَـتين ) meaning two hedgehogs. This association was given to the shepherd Hanna Nassar, who originated from the city of Salt. The story of the shepherd says,

One day Hanna was out herding his sheep in the mountains of Ajloun when the rain started to pour heavily. When rain was getting heavier, Hanna decided to make a head cover from two sacks he had, and the head cover looked like an urchin (hedgehog)- which in Arabic is equal to Quba. Each urchin was on top of the other and helped Nassar protect himself from the rain and cold weather. When Nassar sought shelter in the nearby village of Anjara. The village dwellers, not knowing his name, acknowledged him as “Abu Quba’ain” ( Arabic: أبوقبعين) which translates to "the father of two urchins (hedgehogs)" and thus was the name used ever after to call him and his descendants. 

This is documented in The History of Al-Nasirah written by Alkanan Asa'ad, and this citation includes information from qubain.org, accessed April 30, 2006.  That website is no longer in existence, but my mother, Adele Kubein, had printed the family history and genealogy of the Qubain/Kubein/Qubein family, going all the way back to Hanna Nassar Abu Qubain.

Notable members 
 Salim was the founder of Al’akhaa’ (translates to Friendship) cultural magazine in 1924 in Cairo.
 Najeeb was the first Arabic Archbishop in 1952 to the Anglican Church  of England in the Levant region.
 Shurki was the first University-educated architect in Jordan and co-founded the Jordan Engineering Union in 1953.
 Adel Najib donated funds to help build St. Mary of Nazareth Catholic Church in 1984.

Qubain Foundation 
In 1992, while attending the funeral of Issa Jeries, the elders of the family decided to establish a foundation that pools annual fees from the working men resident in Jordan. The foundation was to allocate funds to family funeral needs. The foundation grew to be a social event organization and digital documentary advocates for the family.

In 2011, the active leaders of the foundation were identified as Makram Adel, Fadel Jubrae'l Qubain, Samer Fuad and Basil Qubain.

.

References

Notes

Sources 
The History of Nazareth by Reverend Asad Mansour Al Shaaeri. Hilal Press - Cairo, Egypt 1924.

Surnames
Jordanian families